Xenion ignitum is a species of ground beetle in the family Carabidae, found in southeast Europe and Turkey.

Subspecies
These two subspecies belong to the species Xenion ignitum:
 Xenion ignitum ignitum (Kraatz, 1875)
 Xenion ignitum laticolle Maran, 1930

References

Carabidae
Beetles described in 1875